The Broxbourne Council election, 1995 was held to elect council members of the Broxbourne Borough Council, the local government authority of the borough of Broxbourne, Hertfordshire, England.

Composition of expiring seats before election

Election results

Results summary 
An election was held in 14 wards on 4 May 1995.

15 seats were contested at this election. (2 seats in Waltham Cross South Ward)

This election was noteworthy for the success of the Labour Party who gained 6 seats at the expense of the Conservative Party.

The Labour Party also came first in the popular poll.

This is the only Broxbourne election in which the Conservative Party failed to "win" either in terms of seats won or votes cast.

The 1995 Broxbourne Local Government election was also the final occasion that the Liberal Democrats won a council seat when Paul Seeby defended his Rosedale seat.

Councillor Seeby was subsequently to "cross the floor" of the council chamber to join the Conservative Party.

Ward results

References

1995
1995 English local elections
1990s in Hertfordshire